Óðinn Þór Ríkharðsson (23 October 1997) is an Icelandic professional handball player for Kadetten Schaffhausen and the Icelandic national handball team.

He represented Iceland at the 2019 World Men's Handball Championship.

References

1997 births
Living people
Odinn Thor Rikhardsson
Odinn Thor Rikhardsson
Expatriate handball players
Odinn Thor Rikhardsson